Ricardo López Bello (born 13 February 1937 in Cabrui, A Coruña, Galicia, Spain) was a member of the House of Commons of Canada. He was a businessman by trade.

He represented the Quebec riding of Châteauguay where he was first elected in the 1984 federal election and re-elected in 1988, therefore becoming a member in the 33rd and 34th Canadian Parliaments. He was a member of the Progressive Conservative (PC) Party. He did not serve in the cabinet under PC prime ministers Brian Mulroney or Kim Campbell. His main claim to fame in the House of Commons was that when he rose to address the assembly, both English and French interpreters would immediately start to try to decipher his speech due to his thick accent.

Lopez left federal politics after he lost his seat in 1993 to Maurice Godin of the Bloc Québécois. He was also defeated at the same riding in the 2000 federal election, this time a candidate for the Canadian Alliance.

Electoral history

External links
 
 Norman Spector coverage from September 2008 

1937 births
Living people
Members of the House of Commons of Canada from Quebec
Politicians from Madrid
Progressive Conservative Party of Canada MPs
Businesspeople from Madrid
Spanish emigrants to Canada